A La Costa Sud (La Musique De La Côte D'Azur) is a compilation album created and produced by Italian musician and producer Pino Presti, released in 2009 on Edizioni Musicali Curci.
The album consists of 3 CDs performed by 28 vocalists and / or instrumentalists who are from various continents and nations but who regularly play in theaters, clubs and festivals in the French Riviera. We can find, among others, female singers Shirley Bunnie Foy, Lilian Terry, Janysett McPherson, Nina Papa, Isa Rabaraona, Georgia Mancio, Timothée; trumpeter François Chassagnite, bassist Jean-Marc Jafet, pianist Francesco Crosara, saxophonist Ruben Paz, singer-bassist Scott Parker Allen, guitarist Linus Olsson.

Genres of music
The album includes many different genres of music like jazz, Latin music, world, funk, pop, electro, Nu Jazz and R&B.

Video
The broadcasting of the photographic video of A La Costa Sud has been made by Monte Carlo Producer Note and by Cannes France, the complete guide to Cannes, France, which broadcast it during the Cannes Film Festival.

Track listing

Cd1 - A La Costa Latin and World 

 Salsa Universal (B. Sundres / R. Quintero) - Conjunto Massalia (Cuba-France)
 Canto A Yemaya (J. McPherson) - Conjunto Massalia
 Partage (D. Gaspari)  - Conjunto Massalia
 Alguien En Quien Confiar (J. McPherson) - Janysett McPherson (Cuba)
 Vocè Vai Ver (A.C. Jobim) - Nina Papa (Brazil)
 Sabe Vocè (C. Lyra / V. De Moraes) - Nina Papa
 Dowtown Guaguanco (R. Paz) - Ruben Paz (Cuba)
 African Spirit (R. Paz) - Ruben Paz
 Oxala (O. Roura) Oxai Roura (Guyana-Brazil)
 Balance (F.D. F. Alves / G. Anfosso) - Gabriel Anfosso (France)
 A Felicidade (A.C. Jobim) - Montparnasse (Italy-France)
 Gémeaux  (F.D. F. Alves / G. Anfosso) - Gabriel Anfosso
 Samba Um (R. Torre / Allan Jones) - Samba Um (Brazil)
 Além Do Rio  (R. Torre / R. Pereira) - Samba Um
 Gimme Gimme Gimme (G.Daks) - Groovy Daks (Ghana)
 Ny Fanahy (I. Rabaraona) - Isa Rabaraona (Madagascar)
 Gabrielle (T. Galliano) - Thierry Galliano (France)
 Si Vocè Voltar  (N. Luchi) - Nicolas Luchi (France) / Linus Olsson (Sweden)
 Nkommode (G.Daks) - Groovy Daks

Cd2 -  A La Costa Jazz 

 Don't Ever Go Away (Jobim / Duran / Gilbert) - Lilian Terry (UK-Italy-Egypt)
 Phaléne  (F. D'Oelnitz) - François Chassagnite (France)
 Nica's Dream (H. Silver) - Nina Papa (Brazil)
 Suite Venus (F. Crosara) - Francesco Crosara USA-Italy)
 Miami Nights  (A. Bianchi) - Amedeo (Italy)
 In And Out (J.M. Jafet) - Jean Marc Jafet (France)
 It Don't Mean a Thing (Mills / Ellington) Shirley Bunnie Foy (USA)
 The Old Country (N. Adderly / C. R. Davis) - Georgia Mancio (UK)
 Easy To Love (C. Porter) - Francesco Crosara
 Funky Dream (A. Bianchi) - Amedeo
 God Bless the Child  (Holiday/ Herzog) - Lilian Terry
 Lookin' For (G. Prestipino G.) - Pino Presti Sound (Italy)
 Mantega Righi (J.M. Jafet) - Jean Marc Jafet
 Something Old...Something New (A. Bianchi) - Amedeo
 Harlem Town (S.B. Foy / G. Fabris) - Shirley Bunnie Foy / Josh Fabris (Italy)
 On Verra (L. Olsson) - Linus Olsson (Sweden)
 When Sunny Gets Blue (J/ Segal / M. Fisher) - Shirley Bunnie Foy

Cd3 -  A La Costa Love Flavors 

 Douce France (C.Trenet) - Christophe Chapelle (France)
 Something Stupid (C.Carson Parker) - Scott Parker Allen (USA)
 You Will Be All Right (E./M. Benlolo) - Santos (France)
 Stekache (N. Luchi) - Nicolas Luchi (France)
 Le Fruit Qu'on Fit (T. Delcourt)  - Timothée (France)
 Now Loading (M. Guillermont) - Marc Guillermont (France)
 Round About Midnight (T. Monk) - Eddy & Dus meet Lilian Terry (UK)
 I Wanna Bioman (S. P. Allen) - Scott Parker Allen
 Business World (E./M. Benlolo) - Santos
 L.O.V.E. (M. Gabler / B. Kaempfert) Shirley Bunnie Foy USA)
 Decembre (Succede A Dicembre) - (P. Palma / D. Viccaro / G. Prestipino / M.Luca) - Janysett McPherson (Cuba)
 Lady Ann (prologue) - (M. Guillermont) - Marc Guillermont
 I'm Longing For Love (Seymour / D. Modugno) - Pino Presti & Mad of Jazz
 Intro Sakai (L. Olsson) - Linus Olsson feat. Yona Yacoub (Francia)
 Vierge   (F.D. F. Alves / G. Anfosso) - Gabriel Anfosso (France)
 Try To Be Somebody (E./M. Benlolo) - Santos
 Elegie (F. Apostoly) - Les Dupont (France)
 Ue Lé Lé (S.B. Foy) - Shirley Bunnie Foy

Artists 

Producer: Pino Presti
Realization: Federico Sacchi for Edizioni Musicali Curci
Co-Producer: Dominique Viccaro
Artwork: Fabrizio Marzagalia
Production assistant:  Marie Joëlle Colin
Post-Production: Philippe Frache-D'Arco (Nice)
Mastering: Studio Arion  (Nice)
Website by Luca Da Rios

References

External links 
 
Video on NME
allmusic
Video on Montecarlo Producer Note
Video on First Post
Video on The complete guide to Cannes, France
Video on Cannes France - Cannes Film Festival

2009 compilation albums
Albums conducted by Pino Presti
Albums arranged by Pino Presti
Albums produced by Pino Presti